And Here Comes Bucknuckle is a 1981 TV series set in the world of horseracing. It was written by Alan Hopgood and was a sequel to Hopgood's play And the Big Men Fly.

It aired as part of "Australia week" on the ABC.

References

External links
And Here Comes Bucknuckle at IMDb

Australian Broadcasting Corporation original programming
Australian comedy-drama television series
1981 Australian television series debuts